A number of different centipede species in the family Scutigeridae are known as the house centipede, including:
Scutigera coleoptrata, originally from the Mediterranean region, but now found almost worldwide
Allothereua maculata, endemic to Australia

Animal common name disambiguation pages